New Jersey Transit operates or contracts out the following routes within Camden, Gloucester, and Salem counties. All routes are "exact fare" lines.

Routes

Directly operated
These routes are operated directly by New Jersey Transit.

Contract operations
This line is operated for New Jersey Transit by Salem County Transit, and is an exact fare line.

Former routes
This list includes routes that have been renumbered or are now operated by private companies.

External links

 450
Lists of New Jersey bus routes